This is a list of criminal (or arguably, allegedly, or potentially criminal) acts intentionally involving radioactive substances. Inclusion in this list does not necessarily imply that anyone involved was guilty of a crime. For accidents or crimes that involved radioactive substances unbeknownst to those involved, see the Nuclear and radiation accidents and incidents.

Murder and attempted murder

The Karlsruhe plutonium affair
Johannes M. was convicted of attempting to poison his ex-wife in 2001 with plutonium stolen from WAK (Wiederaufbereitungsanlage Karlsruhe), a small scale reprocessing plant where he worked. He did not steal a large amount of plutonium, only rags used for wiping surfaces and a small amount of liquid waste. At least two people (besides the criminal) were contaminated by the plutonium. Two flats in Landau in the Rhineland-Palatinate were contaminated, and had to be cleaned at a cost of two million euro. Photographs of the case and details of other nuclear crimes have been presented by a worker at the Institute for Transuranium Elements.

The Litvinenko assassination

Alexander Litvinenko died from polonium-210 poisoning in London in 2006. British officials said investigators had concluded the murder of Litvinenko was "a 'state-sponsored' assassination orchestrated by Russian security services." On 20 January 2007 British police announced that they had "identified the man they believe poisoned Alexander Litvinenko," Andrei Lugovoi.

On 21 September 2012, a story was posted in various UK newspapers suggesting the existence of an ongoing cover-up by the British Government over the material facts of the case.
The report suggests that many aspects of the case may "never see the light of day" due to the significant risk to UK/Russian relations and the implications of the declaration that an act of nuclear terrorism took place on British soil.

Roman Tsepov homicide
Roman Tsepov, a politically influential Russian who provided security to Vladimir Putin and others, fell sick on 11 September 2004 after a trip to Moscow, and died on 24 September. A postmortem investigation found a poisoning by an unspecified radioactive material. He had symptoms similar to Aleksandr Litvinenko.

Zheleznodorozhny criminal radiological act
An unnamed truck driver was killed by five months of radiation exposure to a  caesium-137 source (about 15 mg) that had been put into the door of his truck around February 1995. He died of radiation-induced leukemia on 27 April 1997.

Vladimir Kaplun radiation homicide
In 1993, director of the Kartontara packing company Vladimir Kaplun was killed by radioactive material (cobalt-60 and/or cesium-137) placed in his chair. He died of radiation sickness after a month of hospitalization. The source of the radiation was found after his death.

Karen Silkwood poisoning allegations
On November 5, 1974, Kerr-McGee worker and labor union activist Karen Silkwood found herself exposed to plutonium-239 after working to grind and polish plutonium pellets by way of a glovebox to be used in nuclear fuel rods at the Cimarron Fuel Fabrication Site in Oklahoma. Inspection of the gloves would yield no evidence of external leakage of radioactive contaminant from the glovebox, despite the fact that plutonium had been found on those surfaces of the gloves that had contact with Silkwood's hands, and no other source for a plutonium leak could be ascertained despite thorough inspections of the air vents and surrounding surfaces. However, on November 6, despite Silkwood's prior decontamination and self-inspection, a detection on her part the next day yielded more signs of alpha activity on her hands, while health physics staff at the plant subsequently detected further alpha activity on her right forearm, neck and face. On November 7, Silkwood tested positive for very significant levels of alpha activity, and an inspection of her apartment showed high levels of radioactive contamination. Thereafter, Silkwood and two other co-workers personally associated with her (roommate Sherri Ellis and boyfriend Drew Stephens) would be tested at Los Alamos National Laboratory; while the latter two only tested positive for insignificant amounts of plutonium exposure, Silkwood was found to have  of plutonium-239 in her lungs, though researcher Dr. George Voelz insisted that this amount was still negligible and non-harmful. Later posthumous measurements taken after Silkwood's death under separate but likewise controversial circumstances were shown to be roughly consistent with the initial findings described by Dr. Voelz, but also indicated that she had somehow ingested plutonium prior to her demise. It would also be found that Karen Silkwood would not have had access to plutonium-239 for months after her transfer from metallography to rod assembly.

Allegations that Silkwood's exposure to plutonium-239 was a deliberate act of radiation poisoning are fueled by the fact that she was in possession of potentially compromising evidence that linked Kerr-McGee with egregious safety violations, encompassing unsafe workplace conditions at the plant, faulty manufacture of fuel rod components that posed a potential public safety risk, and even substantial missing plutonium supplies that were unaccounted for; Silkwood also contended that she had evidence that photographs containing evidence of hairline cracks in the fuel rods may have been doctored by company personnel as a cover-up. As Silkwood was coordinating with fellow union members and had been en route to meet a journalist to present and discuss evidence she had found of Kerr-McGee's actions at the time of her death, unverified assertions that Kerr-McGee or other associated parties may have been involved in her radiation exposure and later fatal car accident have circulated in the following period.

Intentional theft or attempted theft of radioactive material
For accidental theft or attempted theft of radioactive materials, see the Nuclear and radiation accidents and incidents#Trafficking and thefts.

Grozny cobalt theft or attempted theft
On 13 September 1999, six people attempted to steal radioactive cobalt-60 rods from a chemical plant in the city of Grozny in the Chechen Republic. During the theft, the suspects opened the radioactive material container and handled it, resulting in the deaths of three of the suspects and injury of the remaining three. The suspect who held the material directly in his hands died of radiation exposure 30 minutes later. This incident is described as an attempted theft, but some of the rods are reportedly still missing.

Official use of X-ray equipment and other radiation technology by secret police
Some former East German dissidents claim that the Stasi used X-ray equipment to induce cancer in political prisoners. After the fall of the Socialist Republic of Romania, files released indicated that the secret police, Securitate, had intentionally induced cancer in striking miners.

Similarly, some anti-Castro activists claim that the Cuban secret police sometimes used radioactive isotopes to induce cancer in "adversaries they wished to destroy with as little notice as possible". In 1997, the Cuban expatriate columnist Carlos Alberto Montaner called this method "the Bulgarian Treatment", after its alleged use by the Bulgarian secret police.

Illicit, fraudulent, and patent medicine
In the early 20th century a series of products claiming medicinal properties, which contained radioactive elements were marketed to the general public. This does not include certain medications that contain radioactive isotopes (e.g. iodine-131 for its oncological uses) but pertains to elixirs and other medications that made preposterous claims (see below) that were neither scientific nor verifiable.

Radithor, a well known patent medicine or snake oil, is possibly the best known example of radioactive quackery. It consisted of triple distilled water containing at a minimum  each of the radium-226 and radium-228 isotopes.

Radithor was manufactured from 1918 to 1928 by the Bailey Radium Laboratories, Inc., of East Orange, New Jersey. The head of the laboratories was listed as Dr. William J. A. Bailey, not a medical doctor. It was advertised as "A Cure for the Living Dead" as well as "Perpetual Sunshine".

These radium elixirs were marketed similar to the way opiates were peddled to the masses with laudanum an age earlier, and electrical cure-alls during the same time period such as the Prostate Warmer.

The eventual death of the socialite Eben Byers from Radithor consumption and the associated radiation poisoning led to the strengthening of the Food and Drug Administration's powers and the demise of most radiation based patent medication.

See also
Nuclear terrorism
Lists of nuclear disasters and radioactive incidents
List of attacks on nuclear plants
Radioactive scrap metal
Radioactive waste

External links
Johnston's Archive: Criminal acts causing radiation casualties
Theodore Gray's Periodic Table of Elements
Scientific American; August 1993; The Great Radium Scandal; by Roger Macklis

Notes

References

radioactive substances
Nuclear terrorism
Nuclear technology-related lists
Radioactive quackery